Shaanbei or Northern Shaanxi is the portion of China's Shaanxi province north of the Huanglong Mountain and the Meridian Ridge (the so-called "Guanzhong north mountains"), and is both a geographic as well as a cultural area. 
It makes up the southeastern portion of the Ordos Basin and forms the northern part of the Loess Plateau.  The region includes two prefectural cities of Yulin, which is known for the Ming Great Wall traversing through its northern part; and Yan'an, which is known as the birthplace of the Chinese Communist Revolution.

Geography

Elevation tends to increase from northwest to southeast. The northern portions degrade into the Ordos Desert, while the southern portions slope up into hills. Shaanbei is generally perceived to include all of Yulin and the northern half of Yan'an prefectures, while the mountainous southern Yan'an is based around the Luo River valley and regarded as part of the Guanzhong Basin.

Culture
Shaanbei culture includes a number of distinct art forms, such as its distinctive forms of folk singing, waist-drums, paper-cutting, and a distinct form of painting known as "farmer painting". The predominant language of Shaanbei is Jin Chinese, with the southern areas being a transition zone into Guanzhong dialect.

Shaanbei folk singing 
Shaanbei's style of folk-singing is distinct from other types of folk singing throughout China, and has gained fame via a number of media depictions, such as in the 1984 film Yellow Earth. The songs are typically about the struggles of rural life, such as poverty and arranged marriages. Many of these folks songs are hundreds of years old, and passed down from generation to generation.

Waist drums 
Certain celebrations in Shaanbei are accompanied by dancers hoisting Ansai waist-drums called yaogu (腰鼓), small drums strapped to the front of the dancers' waist. This tradition gained national notoriety through the film Yellow Earth, which included a scene featuring over 150 real drummers from the region.

Paper cutting 
Paper cutting is another art-form traditional to the Shaanbei region, serving a number of different purposes. In addition to beautifying the environment during important festivals, paper cut art also serves as a symbol of love and fertility during marriage, can be used to pay respects to various religious figures, incorporated into embroidery, or simply serve as toys.

Farmer painting 
Shaanbei farmer painting is a tradition hundreds of years old, dating back to dynastic promotion of painting. These types of paintings often feature bright colors and depictions of animals. Key characteristics of farmer painting is that it commonly takes on subjects specific to the local region, its emphasis on expression rather than adhering to specific rules, use of thick outlines of shapes, use of artist's conception, heavy usage of symbolism, and bright colors.

See also
Shaannan, which refers to the southern part of the province.
Heilongdawang Temple

References 

Regions of China
Geography of Shaanxi